The 2014 CAMS WA AUS F1000 Championship was a CAMS sanctioned Australian state motor racing title for drivers of Formula 1000 racing cars. It was the first state series for Formula 1000s to be held in Australia. The championship was contested over five round series which began on 26 April at Barbagallo Raceway and ended on 21 September at the same track. It was won by Stewart Burns, driving a Speads JKS 01.

Teams and drivers

The following teams and drivers contested the 2014 CAMS WA AUS F1000 Championship. Each car was powered by a 1000cc motorcycle engine, as mandated by the category regulations.

Calendar

The championship was contested over a four round series, with three races at each round, all of which were held at Barbagallo Raceway. A fifth round to be held in June was cancelled.

Points system

Championship points were awarded on a 25-20-18-17-16 basis to the top five classified finishers in each race. The results for each round of the Series were determined by the number of points scored by each driver at that round. The driver gaining the highest points total over the five rounds was declared the winner of the Championship.

Results

References

2014 in Australian motorsport
Wanneroo Raceway
Motorsport in Western Australia